The Central Archives of the Ministry of Defence of the Russian Federation (TsAMO RF) are located in Podolsk, just south of the city of Moscow.

As a departmental archive of Russia, it stores documents of different staffs and offices, associations and formations, units, institutions and military academies of the Soviet Defence Ministry from 1941 until the end of the 1980s. It comes under the command of the Rear Services of the Armed Forces of Russia. It has data on the history, culture and military education of the Ministry of Defence (Russia).

Founded in 1936, the archive moved to Podolsk in Moscow Oblast around 1946.

In 1992 a branch of TsAMO was established in Pugachyov in Saratov Oblast.

Colonel Igor Albertovich Permyakov serves as head of the archivе, in post in 2010 and still .

History 
TsAMO was founded on 2 July 1936 as the archives department of the People's Commissariat of Defense of the Soviet Union (NKO). In 1941, it was evacuated to the town of Buzuluk in Orenburg Oblast. The department was renamed the History and Archives Department of the NKO in 1943, and in 1944 it became the Archives Department of the Administration of the Red Army in the NKO.  In 1946, the department was relocated to Podolsk, taking over the former site of a military school. On 21 July 1947, the department became the Archive of the Ministry of the Armed Forces of the Soviet Union. On 25 February 1950, it became the Archive of the Military Ministry of the Soviet Union, and on 15 March 1953 the Archive of the Ministry of Defense of the Soviet Union.

On 15 November 1975, the archive was renamed the Central Archive of the Ministry of Defense of the Soviet Union. It briefly served as the Central Archives of the Unified Armed Forces of the Commonwealth of Independent States from 12 March 1992 before becoming the Central Archives of the Ministry of Defense of Russia on 10 June 1992.

In late March 2008 media reported unofficially that during the visit to TsAMO of Defence Minister Anatoliy Serdyukov, it was decided to close TsAMO and transfer of territory for building an archive. In case of confirmation of this information, the likelihood that material may go missing or be destroyed during the relocation of the archives, is extremely high enough.

Structure 
TsAMO Russia keeps some 90,000 funds, including 18,600,000 units of storage. The organization funds are in general conformity with the principles of the organization of the Soviet Armed Forces: independent foundations are documents departments of the central apparatus of the Ministry of Defense, offices of military districts, armies, departments, divisions, units and individual agencies.

TsAMO's structure includes more than a dozen departments, including the following departments that store documents on the integration of personnel:
 2nd Department – provides Award Documents (instructions on decorating and decorations sheets)
 5th Department – contains the personal files of officers and generals
 6th Department – contains documents on the political composition of the Red Army, including a card-index file of record losses and
 9th Department – includes a card index of losses of NCOs and other ranks, as well as a card index of those held captive and liberated by Soviet troops
 11-second section – contains four files:
 a personal account of the officer and the general's convoy
 loss of officers and the general's convoy
 war generals and officers who died in captivity
 awarded orders and medals for all personnel of the Red Army (including privates and sergeants)

The main building houses a scientific reference library where one can get acquainted with the literature on the period of the Second World War, including handbooks on military units and formations.

Notes

External links

General information 
 ЦАМО РФ на сайте Министерства обороны Российской Федерации
 ЦАМО РФ на сайте «Архивы России»
 Тема «ЦАМО» на форуме сайта Всероссийское генеалогическое древо
 Лариса Романовская. В списках не значится. Запросы от населения в ЦАМО РФ рассматриваются больше года // «Культура» № 17 (7476), май 2005 г.
 Виктория Чуткова. Не до ордена: Юбилей отшумел, награды, как и прежде, остались ждать своих героев // «Новая газета», 27.06.2005

Guidelines for searching at TsAMO 
 Первый раз в ЦАМО. Советы новичку
 Поисковые архивные исследовани(методичка)
 Тема «Что, где и как ищем в ЦАМО РФ?» на форуме сайта Всероссийское генеалогическое древо
 Тема «Как попасть в ЦАМО» на форуме сайта Всероссийское генеалогическое древо
 Тема «Без вести пропавший и ЦАМО» на форуме сайта Всероссийское генеалогическое древо
 Тема «Помощь в ЦАМО г. Подольск» на форуме сайта Всероссийское генеалогическое древо
 Тема «Могу поискать в ЦАМО» на форуме сайта Всероссийское генеалогическое древо
 Тема «Пофамильный поиск в архиве погибших и пропавших без вести (с ксерокопиями документов)»

Difficulties in accessing documents in TsAMO 
 Георгий Рамазашвили. Центральный архив Министерства обороны Российской Федерации: проблема доступа к документам // «Отечественные архивы». 2004. № 2.
 Георгий Рамазашвили. Портянка с грифом «секретно» // «Совершенно секретно». 2004. № 5 (180).
 Георгий Рамазашвили. Есть такая профессия — историю зачищать: ЦАМО РФ в преддверии 60-летия Победы // «Неприкосновенный запас». 2005. № 2–3 (40–41).
 Георгий Рамазашвили. Раскопать архив Минюстом // «Московские Новости». 2005. № 07.
 Георгий Рамазашвили. Секреты-шмекреты и Куликовская битва // «Новое литературное обозрение». 2005. № 74.
 Георгий Рамазашвили. Искусство секретить портянки // «Индекс/Досье на цензуру». 2003. № 19.
 Георгий Рамазашвили Войны за просвещение — доступ к истории в наших руках // «Индекс/Досье на цензуру». 2007. № 26.
 Денис Бабиченко. Тайное общество: Приказ министра обороны о рассекречивании архивов Великой Отечественной войны так и не сделал тайное явным // «Итоги». 2007. № 29.
 Борис Соколов. Предъявите документы!
 Тема «Исследования в ЦАМО» на форуме сайта Всероссийское генеалогическое древо

Ministry of Defence (Russia)
Military of the Soviet Union
Archives in Russia
Soviet archives